KAJN may refer to:

 KAJN-FM, a radio station (102.9 FM) licensed to serve Crowley, Louisiana, United States
 KAJN-CD, a television station (channel 19, virtual 40) licensed to serve Lafayette, Louisiana